Rushikonda Beach located in Visakhapatnam on the coast of Bay of Bengal in the Indian state of Andhra Pradesh. The beach is maintained by the state tourism board, APTDC.

Transportation
APSRTC runs buses to this area with these routes:

See also 
List of beaches in India

References 

Beaches of Andhra Pradesh
Tourist attractions in Visakhapatnam
Geography of Visakhapatnam
Geography of Visakhapatnam district
Uttarandhra